Dănuţ Tănăsel Prodan (born 13 January 1985) is a Romanian former footballer.

External links
 

1985 births
Living people
Sportspeople from Bacău
Romanian footballers
Association football forwards
Liga I players
Liga II players
CSM Ceahlăul Piatra Neamț players
FCV Farul Constanța players
FC Gloria Buzău players
AFC Dacia Unirea Brăila players
CS Otopeni players